Puno't Dulo (Filipino, "The Beginning and the End") is the sixth studio album by The Dawn, released on July 28, 1994 and the last album the band released when they went hiatus. the band reunited in 2000.

Track listing

Personnel
 Jett Pangan - vocals
 JB Leonor - drums
 Francis Reyes - guitars
 Carlos Balcells - bass guitar

References

The Dawn (band) albums
1994 albums